Hamza Alavi (10 April 1921 – 1 December 2003)  was a Pakistani Marxist academic sociologist and activist.

Biography
Alavi was born in the Bohra community in Karachi, then in British India (the area is now in Pakistan) and migrated in adulthood to the UK. The focus of his academic work was nationality, gender, fundamentalism and the peasantry. His most noted work was perhaps his 1965 essay Peasant And Revolution in the Socialist Register which stressed the militant role of the middle peasantry. These middle peasants were then viewed as the class in the rural areas which were most naturally the allies of the urban working class. In the 1960s he was one of the co-founders of the Campaign Against Racial Discrimination.
He believed that a “salary-dependent class of Muslim government servants, called the ‘salariat’ led the movement of an independent state for Muslims in the subcontinent as they saw a decrease in their share of jobs in pre-partition India. which finally resulted in the creation of Pakistan. He used the concept of "Colonial Mode of Production" in Indian agriculture, which is different from feudal and capitalist mode.

Selected publications 
His publications include:  
 Jagirdari or Samraaj, fiction house Lhr (Urdu)
 Takhleq-e-Pakistan, Fiction House Lhr   (Urdu)
 Pakistan Ek Riasat ka Bohraan, Fiction House Lhr (Urdu)
 Alavi, Hamza (1965) Peasant and Revolution, Socialist Register, pp. 241–77
 Alvi, Hamza  & Shanin, Teodor (2003) Introduction to the Sociology of "Developing Societies", Monthly Review Press
 Alavi, H. (1982). Capitalism and colonial production. London: Croom Helm. 
 Alvi, H., & Harriss, J. (1989). South Asia. New York: Monthly Review Press. 
 Alvi, H., & Harriss, J. (1989). Sociology of 'developing societies': South Asia. Basingstoke: Macmillan Education. 
 Halliday, Fred & Alavi, Hamza (1988) State and Ideology in the Middle East and Pakistan, Monthly Review Press

References 

British sociologists
Development specialists
1921 births
2003 deaths
Dawoodi Bohras
Pakistani Ismailis
Pakistani academics
British writers of Pakistani descent
Pakistani sociologists
Pakistani Marxists
Pakistani emigrants to the United Kingdom
English-language writers from Pakistan